Greed is an excessive desire to possess wealth or goods with the intention to keep it for one's self.

Greed may also refer to:

Books  
 Greed (Jelinek novel), a 2000 novel by Elfriede Jelinek
Greed, a novel by Robin Wasserman
 Greed Magazine, a 1990s American music, comics, and culture periodical

Film and television 
 Greed (1924 film), a film by Erich von Stroheim
 Greed (2006 film), a film featuring Jason London
 Greed (2019 film), a satirical film by Michael Winterbottom
 Greed (game show), a 1999 American TV quiz show
 Greed (UK game show), a British television quiz show
 WCW Greed, a professional wrestling pay-per-view TV show
 "Greed", a 1995 episode of 2point4 children

Characters 
 Greed (Fullmetal Alchemist), a character in the Fullmetal Alchemist series
 Greed, a character in the allegorical poem Psychomachia by Prudentius
 Greeed, the villains from the Tokusatsu series Kamen Rider OOO

Music 
 Greed (Swans album), 1986
 Greed (Ambitious Lovers album), 1988
 Greed (Pulkas album), 1998
 "Greed" (song), a 2001 song by Godsmack
 "Greed" from the album Tuonela, by the band Amorphis

Other uses 
 Greed (dice game)
 Greedy algorithm
 John Greed (born 1966), jewelry designer and retailer

See also 
 Greedy (disambiguation)